Goalmouth is a British television series focusing on football. The series made its debut on 12 May 2011 on Disney XD in the United Kingdom and Ireland. It is the first original series produced by Disney XD. On 23 January 2012, a second series was ordered by Disney XD. The third series was announced on 13 February 2013. On 27 March 2014, Disney UK commissioned a fourth season.

Plot
Adam Gendle and Tim Warwood share their knowledge about football and compare players between segments that show teams playing. Francis Vu and Charlotte Lade offer some tricks, players partner with kids to improve their skills, and the hosts take part challenges that help them. Other recurring segments explore the history of football and revisit notable scores in big-league games.

Cast
 Adam Gendle as the host
 Tim Warwood as the host
 Charlotte Lade as the expert
 Francis Vu as the expert

Episodes

Series 4

References

External links
 Official website

2011 British television series debuts